AmeriCorps (officially the Corporation for National and Community Service or CNCS) is an independent agency of the United States government that engages more than five million Americans in service through a variety of stipended volunteer work programs in many sectors. These programs include AmeriCorps VISTA, AmeriCorps NCCC, AmeriCorps State and National, AmeriCorps Seniors, the Volunteer Generation Fund, and other national service initiatives. The agency's mission is "to improve lives, strengthen communities, and foster civic engagement through service and volunteering." It was created by the National and Community Service Trust Act of 1993. In September 2020, the agency rebranded itself as AmeriCorps, although its official name is unchanged.

Programs
AmeriCorps delivers several programs designed to help communities address poverty, the environment, education, and other unmet human needs. The programs include:

AmeriCorps VISTA

AmeriCorps VISTA, or Volunteers in Service to America (VISTA), was founded in 1965 as a domestic version of the Peace Corps.  The program was incorporated into AmeriCorps and renamed AmeriCorps*VISTA to create AmeriCorps in 1993. VISTA provides full-time members to nonprofit, faith-based and other community organizations, and public agencies to create and expand programs that ultimately bring low-income individuals and communities out of poverty. There are currently over 5,000 VISTA members serving in 1,200 VISTA programs nationwide.

VISTA members take the following oath:
"I do solemnly swear (or affirm) that I will support and defend the Constitution of the United States against all enemies, foreign and domestic; that I will bear true faith and allegiance to the same; that I take this obligation freely, without any mental reservation or purpose of evasion; and that I will well and faithfully discharge the duties of the office on which I am about to enter: So help me God."

AmeriCorps NCCC

AmeriCorps National Civilian Community Corps (NCCC) is a full-time, residential team-based program for men and women ages 18–26. Members serve at one of four regional campuses located throughout the United States (Vicksburg, Mississippi; Vinton, Iowa; Aurora/Denver, Colorado; and Sacramento, California). Each campus focuses efforts on states within its region but may travel to other areas in response to national crises. Former campuses were located in Washington, DC; Charleston, South Carolina; San Diego, California; Baltimore, Maryland; and Perry Point, Maryland.

AmeriCorps State and National
 AmeriCorps State and National is the largest of the AmeriCorps programs, and provides grants to local and national organizations and agencies, including faith-based and community organizations, higher education institutions, and public agencies. Public Land Corps programs and Urban Youth Corps are specifically authorized for funding. The Edward M. Kennedy Serve America Act authorizes Education Corps, Health Futures Corps, Clean Energy Corps, Veterans Corps, and Opportunity Corps programs as qualifying for AmeriCorps programs. Grants assist these groups in recruiting, training and placing AmeriCorps members to meet critical community needs in education, public safety, health, and the environment. AmeriCorps State operates through Service Commissions in each state, such as Volunteer Florida and the Mississippi Commission for Volunteer Service; South Dakota is the only state without a Service Commission. Each state's Service Commission dispenses funding from AmeriCorps to organizations in their states through annual grant competitions.  Since the program's inception, thousands of organizations across the nation have been awarded AmeriCorps State and National grants.

AmeriCorps State and National members engage in direct service activities, such as after-school tutoring or homebuilding, and capacity-building activities, such as volunteer recruitment, for the organizations they serve. After successfully completing their term of service, AmeriCorps State and National members may be eligible for an Education Award of up to $6,095 or equal to the full Pell Grant for the year in which service was approved. The Education Award can pay for additional college or graduate school courses, or it can pay off existing student loans. Full-time members typically complete 1,700 hours of service over 11 months; they also receive a living allowance, health benefits, and child care assistance during their term.

AmeriCorps State and National members take the following pledge:

AmeriCorps Seniors 

The AmeriCorps Seniors umbrella includes three programs that engage seniors aged 55+ in volunteerism: the Foster Grandparents program, through which volunteers teach and mentor children; Senior Companions, through which volunteers help older adults live independently in their homes; and RSVP, through which volunteers can serve in a variety of roles to meet their communities' needs.

Other programs 
MLK Day of Service
September 11th National Day of Service and Remembrance
President's Volunteer Service Award
Presidential Freedom Scholarship Program
Learn and Serve America (discontinued)

Special initiatives

Employers of National Service
On September 12, 2014, President Barack Obama launched the Employers of National Service initiative at the 20th Anniversary of AmeriCorps event on the South Lawn of the White House. Employers participating in the initiative connect to the talent pipeline of AmeriCorps, Peace Corps, and other service year alumni, by indicating in their hiring processes that they view national service experience as a plus. The initiative is a collaboration between AmeriCorps with the Peace Corps, Service Year Alliance, AmeriCorps Alums, and the National Peace Corps Association. To date, over 500 employers have joined the initiative.

History
The Commission on National and Community Service was a new, independent federal agency created as a consequence of the National and Community Service Act of 1990, signed into law by President George H. W. Bush.

The Commission was intentioned to mean to bring about a renewed focus on encouraging volunteering in the United States and was charged with supporting four streams of service:

 Service-learning programs for school-aged youth
 Higher education service programs
 Youth corps
 National service demonstration models

In 1993 the Corporation for National and Community Service was created by merging another agency, ACTION, and the Commission on National and Community Service together, thus ending the Commission.

Timeline
1990: President George H. W. Bush signs the National and Community Service Act of 1990 into law, ushering in a renewed federal focus on encouraging volunteering in the U.S. This legislation created the new independent federal agency called the Commission on National and Community Service.

1992: Enacted as part of the 1993 National Defense Authorization Act, the National Civilian Community Corps (NCCC) is created as a demonstration program to explore the possibility of using post-Cold War military resources to help solve problems here at home. It is modeled on the Depression-era Civilian Conservation Corps and the United States military.

1993: President Bill Clinton signs into passage The National and Community Service Trust Act, formally merging the federal offices of ACTION and the Commission on National and Community Service, including Serve America and NCCC, to form the Corporation for National and Community Service, along with the addition of the new AmeriCorps program.

2002: President George W. Bush creates the USA Freedom Corps.

2020: The agency is rebranded as "AmeriCorps".

Administrative history
Past CEOs of the agency include:

Effectiveness
While discussion has occurred about the range and efficacy of evaluating the successes of AmeriCorps State and National, VISTA, and NCCC programs, there has been a variety of documentation supporting the programs. AmeriCorps provided fiscal resources and personnel to support the start-up of national programs, including Public Allies and Teach For America. It also brought vital resources to established programs, including City Year, Boys and Girls Club, Big Brothers Big Sisters, JusticeCorps and the American Red Cross.

AmeriCorps is reported to increase the effectiveness of community service. Successes for individual AmeriCorps State and National, VISTA, and NCCC members include increasing their commitment to community service, increasing community-based activism, connection to their communities, knowledge of community problems, engagement in the political process, and voting participation.

Additionally, according to a 2007 study released by AmeriCorps, a majority of AmeriCorps State and National, VISTA, and NCCC alumni within the study period claimed they had gained life and job skills, such as leadership, teamwork, time-management, and hands-on experience in a field of interest. The study further reported that 71% of alumni were incentivized to join by the prospect of earning a Segal AmeriCorps Education Award; 41% of members went on to receive a four-year college degree within three years of entering AmeriCorps.

Criticisms
AmeriCorps programs have been criticized as being exploitive of their volunteers, being "voluntourism," and serving to privatize or de-professionalize public services.

In 2018, a A CBS News Radio did an investigation into years of complaints about AmeriCorps programs which found multiple allegations of sexual harassment, abusive behavior and mismanagement since 2013.

See also 

Community service
National service in the United States
Service learning
Gerald Walpin

References

External links

 The Corporation for National and Community Service website
 Corporation for National and Community Service – History
 Corporation for National and Community Service in the Federal Register
 History of Service Learning in Higher Education website
Booknotes interview with Steven Waldman on The Bill: How the Adventures of Clinton's National Service Bill Reveal What is Corrupt, Comic, Cynical -- and Noble -- About Washington, January 29, 1995.

Government agencies established in 1993
Independent agencies of the United States government
Clinton administration initiatives
Volunteering in the United States
Organizations based in Washington, D.C.